The Bokcheon Museum is an archaeology museum in Busan, South Korea. Opened on October 5, 1996, the museum is dedicated to the history of the city of Busan from the Samhan era to the Samguk era. Its artifacts include military weapons, armor, clothing, and household tools unearthed from the Bokcheon-dong burial ground.

References

External links
 Museum website

Museums in Busan